Ann Kendall OBE (6 January 1939 – 23 February 2019) was a British archaeologist who helped restore the Inca irrigation system in Peru.

Biography

She grew up in Brazil and later moved to England for academic purposes. She originally studied at the Central School of Art in London, then later went on to pursue a MA in Interdisciplinary Studies at the UCLA. She received her Phd at the Institute of Archaeology at University College London. As an honorary research associate, she founded the Cusichaca Archaeological Project (CAP) in 1977. This project allowed for research on landscapes and reviving irrigation systems in place in the Peruvian Andes. Creating one of the biggest projects in the area, she became a pioneering archaeologist.

Establishing the Cusichaca Trust in 1977, Anne Kendall worked actively as both the founder of the trust and director for 40 years. The trust led to projects other than the CAP despite initially focusing on a select few areas throughout Peru. Additionally, the trust focused on rural development with particular attention paid to agricultural systems. Not only focusing on archaeology, the Cusichaca Trust helped to work on excavations and other projects including canal and terrace restoration and ethnography. The trust played a major role in reconstructing and helping to create basic services to the communities in which the sites were. The projects involved were engaged by and focused on the community all while incorporating different fields such as rural development and botany. There is an archive currently being created that will digitally incorporate unpublished works from both the Cusichaca Arcaheological Project and from the Cusichaca Trust to be integrated within the Senate House Library.

She died in Spain, where she had moved, at the age of 80. Before moving, she had retired in the UK and lived there with her husband.

Education 

 1963; Central School of Art in London
 1970; MA at UCLA
 PhD at the Institute of Archaeology at University College London

Awards and recognitions 

 1980; Order of Merit by the Peruvian Government
 1994; OBE as result of work involving CAP

Publications
 Toward a definition of music : relation and meaning in music, 1963
 Everyday Life of the Incas : drawings and photographs by the author, 1973
 Inca architecture and planning at the Inca sites in the Cusichaca area (microfilm)., 1974
 Architecture and planning at the Inca sites in the Cusichaca area, 1974
 Aspects of Inca architecture, 1974
 De Inca's, 1975
 Descripción e inventario de las formas arquitéctónicas inca : patrones de distribución e inferencias cronológicas, 1976
 Archaeological research in the lower Urubamba : the Cusichaca Project : problems and evaluation of archaeological procedure, 1976
 Current archaeological projects in the Central Andes : some approaches and results, 1984
 Aspects of Inca architecture, 1985
 The Patacancha project : a new 5-year research project in the Central Andes of Peru, 1988
 Everyday life of the Incas, 1989
 Los patrones de asentamiento y desarrollo rural prehispánico entre Ollantaytambo y Machu Picchu., 1991
 Infraestructura agrícola e hidráulica pre-hispánica : presente y futuro, 1992
 Proyecto arqueológico Cusichaca, Cusco : investigaciones arqueológicas y de rehabilitación agrícola, 1994
 Jean-Pierre Protzen, Inca arquitecture and construction at Ollantambo ..., 1994
 Restauración de sistemas agrícolas prehispánicos en la Sierra Sur, Perú, 1997
 The restoration of Pre-Hispanic agricultural systems : archaeology and indigenous technology and rural development, 1997
 Traditional technology emphasized in a model for Andean rural development., 1997
 Irrigando el futuro : manual para la restauración de sistemas de irrigación prehispánicos en la Sierra Sur, Perú, 1997
 Restauración de andenes prehispánicos en la Sierra Sur del Perú : adaptación de tecnología en zonas sísmicas semiáridas, 2001

References 

1939 births
2019 deaths
British women archaeologists
British archaeologists
Alumni of University College London
Archaeology of Peru
Members of the Order of the British Empire
Place of birth missing
Place of death missing
20th-century British women writers
21st-century British women writers